Robert Deon Potasi Dillingham (born January 4, 2005) is an American professional basketball player for the Overtime Cold Hearts of Overtime Elite (OTE). He is a consensus five-star recruit and one of the top point guards in the 2023 class. He is committed to Kentucky.

High school career
Dillingham was born and raised in Hickory, North Carolina. He played basketball for Combine Academy in Lincolnton, North Carolina. Dillingham emerged as one of the top players in his class by his sophomore season. As a sophomore, he averaged 21.2 points, 4.9 assists, 4.1 rebounds and 2.1 steals per game, leading his team to a 29–3 record and a non-association state title. He was named Charlotte Observer Player of the Year. For his junior year, he transferred to Donda Academy, Ye's school in Simi Valley, California.

Recruiting
Dillingham is a consensus five-star recruit and one of the top point guards in the 2023 class. On December 1, 2021, he committed to playing college basketball for NC State over offers from Memphis, LSU, Kansas and Kentucky. He became the second highest-ranked recruit in program history, behind Dennis Smith Jr.

On March 19, 2022, Dillingham announced his decommitment from NC State and reopened his recruitment.

On June 24, 2022, Dillingham committed to Kentucky over the offers of Louisville, Auburn, and USC. He became Kentucky's second commit in the 2023 recruiting class.

Professional career 
On November 3, 2022, Dillingham left Donda Academy and signed with Overtime Elite, a professional basketball league for high school players. He joined the Overtime Cold Hearts, one of the six teams in the league. Dillingham made his OTE debut on November 11, recording six points, three rebounds and three steals in a 92–84 loss to the YNG Dreamerz.

National team career
Dillingham led the United States to a gold medal at the 2021 FIBA Under-16 Americas Championship in Mexico. He was named most valuable player after averaging 15.7 points, 6.2 assists and 3.2 steals per game. He posted a team-record 31 points, six rebounds, four assists and three steals in a 90–75 win against Argentina in the final.

References

External links
USA Basketball bio

2005 births
Living people
American men's basketball players
Basketball players from North Carolina
People from Hickory, North Carolina
Point guards